The 2022 Copa América Femenina was the 9th edition of the main international women's football championship in South America, the Copa América Femenina, for national teams affiliated with CONMEBOL. The competition was held in Colombia from 8 to 30 July 2022.

The tournament acted as South American qualification for the 2023 FIFA Women's World Cup in Australia and New Zealand, providing three direct qualifying places and two play-off places for the Women's World Cup, and three more places for the 2023 Pan American Games tournament in Santiago (in addition to Chile who qualified automatically as hosts). 
In addition, the two finalists qualified for the football tournament at the 2024 Summer Olympics in France. After this edition, the tournament would be held every two years instead of four.

Brazil, the four-time defending champions, defeated Colombia 1–0 in the final to win their 8th title. As winners, they will compete in the inaugural 2023 Women's Finalissima against England, winners of UEFA Women's Euro 2022.

Teams
All ten CONMEBOL women's national teams were eligible to enter.

Venues
The venues were announced on 16 December 2021. The tournament was held in three cities: Cali, Bucaramanga and Armenia.

Draw
The tournament draw was held on 7 April 2022, 11:00 COT (UTC−5), in Asuncion, Paraguay.

Squads

Match officials
On 8 June 2022, CONMEBOL announced the list of match officials for the tournament.

Referees

  Laura Fortunato
  Adriana Farfán
  Edina Alves Batista
  María Belén Carvajal
  María Victoria Daza
  Susana Corella
  Zulma Quiñónez
  Elizabeth Tintaya
  Sandra Braz
  Anahí Fernández
  Yercinia Correa

Assistant referees

  Mariana de Almeida
  Daiana Milone
  Liliana Bejarano
  Inés Choque
  Neuza Back
  Leila Moreira
  Cindy Nahuelcoy
  Loreto Toloza
  Nataly Arteaga
  Eliana Ortiz
  Mónica Amboya
  Viviana Segura
  Laura Miranda
  Nadia Weiler
  Gabriela Moreno
  Thyty Rodríguez
  Vera Yupanqui
  Andreia Sousa
  Rita Cabañero Mompó
  Luciana Mascaraña
  Adela Sánchez
  Thaity Dugarte

Group stage
The top two teams of each group advanced to the semi-finals, while the two third-placed teams advanced to the fifth place match.

All times are local, COT (UTC−5).

Tiebreakers
The teams were ranked according to points (3 points for a win, 1 point for a draw, and 0 points for a loss). If tied on points, the following criteria would be used to determine the ranking:

 Points obtained in the matches played between the teams in question;
 Goal difference in the matches played between the teams in question;
 Number of goals scored in the matches played between the teams in question;
 Goal difference in all group matches;
 Number of goals scored in all group matches;
 Fewest red cards;
 Fewest yellow cards;
 Drawing of lots.

Group A

Group B

Knockout stage

In the knockout phase, if the fifth-place play-off, semi-finals and third-place play-off were level at the end of 90 minutes of normal playing time, no extra time would be played and the match would be decided by a direct penalty shoot-out. Only if the final was level at the end of the normal playing time, extra time would be played (two periods of 15 minutes each), where each team would be allowed to make an extra substitution. If still tied after extra time, the final would be decided by a penalty shoot-out to determine the champions.

Bracket

Fifth place match
The winners of the fifth place match advanced to the inter-confederation play-offs.

Semi-finals
The winners of the semi-finals qualified for the 2023 FIFA Women's World Cup and the football tournament at the 2024 Summer Olympics.

Third place match
The winners of the third place match qualified for the 2023 FIFA Women's World Cup. The losers advanced to the inter-confederation play-offs.

Final

Statistics

Goalscorers

Awards

Tournament teams ranking
This table shows the ranking of teams throughout the tournament.

Qualification for international tournaments

Qualified teams for FIFA Women's World Cup
The following three teams from CONMEBOL qualified for the 2023 FIFA Women's World Cup, while two teams advanced to the inter-confederation play-offs.

1 Italic indicates hosts for that year.

Qualified teams for Summer Olympics
The following two teams from CONMEBOL qualified for the 2024 Summer Olympic women's football tournament.

2 Italic indicates hosts for that year.

Qualified teams for Pan American Games
The following four teams from CONMEBOL qualified for the 2023 Pan American Games women's football tournament, including Chile which qualified as hosts.

3 Italic indicates hosts for that year.

References

 
2022
2022 in women's association football
2022 in South American football
2023 FIFA Women's World Cup qualification
Football at the 2024 Summer Olympics – Women's qualification
International association football competitions hosted by Colombia
July 2022 sports events in Colombia
C